Natale in India is a 2003 Italian comedy film directed by Neri Parenti.

Cast

See also
 List of Christmas films

References

External links

2003 films
Films directed by Neri Parenti
Films scored by Bruno Zambrini
2000s Italian-language films
2003 comedy films
2000s Christmas comedy films
Italian Christmas comedy films
2000s Italian films